James J. "Jim" Cimino is an American physician-scientist and biomedical informatician. He is Professor of Medicine and Director of the Informatics Institute at the University of Alabama at Birmingham School of Medicine and Adjunct Professor of Biomedical Informatics at Columbia University. He is an elected fellow of the American College of Medical Informatics and a member of the National Academy of Medicine.

Education and training 
Cimino received a Sc.B. in Biology from Brown University in 1977 and an M.D. from New York Medical College in 1981. He completed a residency in internal medicine at Saint Vincent’s Hospital and a fellowship in medical informatics at Massachusetts General Hospital.

Career 
Cimino pioneered the theory and formalisms of medical concept representation underpinning the use of controlled medical vocabularies in electronic medical records in support of clinical decision-making. Training under Octo Barnett at Harvard University, he also contributed to the initiation of the Unified Medical Language System. In addition, he actively practices medicine as an internist and has devoted many years to develop and innovate clinical information systems that have been integrated in the New York–Presbyterian Hospital, and the Columbia University Medical Center.

Cimino currently serves as Professor of Medicine, inaugural Director of the Informatics Institute, and Informatics Director for the Center for Clinical and Translational Science at the UAB School of Medicine. He was previously Chief of the Laboratory for Informatics Development at the NIH Clinical Center and Professor of Biomedical Informatics at Columbia University (2002-2007). At Columbia, he mentored Yves A. Lussier. He remains an Adjunct Professor of Biomedical Informatics at Columbia.

Cimino has published over 200 articles; as of October 2021, his H-index is 72.

References

External links

 James Cimino at the American College of Medical Informatics
 Jim Cimino at Columbia University
 Medline Publications
 

Living people
New York Medical College alumni
United States National Library of Medicine
Health informaticians
Harvard University alumni
Brown University alumni
Columbia University faculty
Year of birth missing (living people)
Place of birth missing (living people)
Members of the National Academy of Medicine
21st-century American physicians